"Apples and Oranges" is the third UK single by Pink Floyd, the final one written by Syd Barrett, and released in 1967. The B-side was "Paint Box" written by Richard Wright. The song is about a girl whom the narrator meets at the supermarket.

The song was recorded shortly before the band's US tour, on 26 and 27 October.

TV performances
Pink Floyd, along with Barrett, mimed the song on their first US televised performances on The Pat Boone Show and American Bandstand. Barrett kept his lips closed during the first performance but mimed competently on the latter show, of which footage survives. After Barrett was replaced by David Gilmour, the band recorded a promotional film in Belgium in a fruit market with Roger Waters lip synching, as Barrett had left the band by this point.

Release
This was the group's first single that failed to break into the UK charts, and their US label Tower Records issued a US-only single instead: "Flaming" b/w "The Gnome" (Tower 378). Waters blamed the single's sales performance on Norman Smith: "'Apples and Oranges' was destroyed by the production. It's a fucking good song". When the single failed to reach the charts, Barrett's reply was that he "couldn't care less."

Further release
Both sides of the single were mixed in stereo, but the single was issued in mono, which was very muddy and probably contributed to its lack of success.  The stereo mix of "Paint Box" first appeared on the Relics compilation (1971), and both tracks appeared in stereo on the Masters of Rock compilation (1974). The other four early UK singles were issued in mono originally. "Arnold Layne", "See Emily Play", "It Would Be So Nice", and "Point Me at the Sky" only exist in mono or false stereo, while "Julia Dream" was remixed for stereo at a later time, for inclusion on Relics. Mono and stereo mixes of "Apples and Oranges" and the mono mix of "Paint Box" are included in the 40th Anniversary Deluxe Edition release of The Piper at the Gates of Dawn.

Reception
"It's a happy song, and it's got a touch of Christmas. It's about a girl who I saw just walking round town, in Richmond." — Syd Barrett

NME hailed it as "the most psychedelic single the Pink Floyd have come up with", however, it was "pretty hard to get a hold of".

Personnel 
Syd Barrett – electric guitar, lead vocals
Richard Wright – Hammond organ, piano, electric piano, backing vocals, falsetto lead vocals (bridge)
Roger Waters – bass guitar, backing vocals
Nick Mason – drums, tambourine

References

Bibliography

 
 
 
 
 
 
 

1967 singles
Pink Floyd songs
Songs written by Syd Barrett
1967 songs
Columbia Records singles
Psychedelic pop songs